The Dobârlău is a right tributary of the river Tărlung in Covasna County, Romania. It flows into the Tărlung in Lunca Mărcușului.

References

Rivers of Romania
Rivers of Covasna County